Ten Mile Lake or Tenmile Lake may refer to:

Lakes
Ten Mile Lake (Cass County, Minnesota)
Tenmile Lake (Beltrami County, Minnesota)
Ten Mile Lake, in Lac qui Parle County, Minnesota
Tenmile Lake (Otter Tail County, Minnesota)
Tenmile Lake (Oregon), in Coos County
Ten Mile Lake (Nova Scotia), in Halifax Regional Municipality
Ten Mile Lake (Great Northern Peninsula), on the Great Northern Peninsula of Newfoundland, Canada
Ten Mile Lake (Eastern Newfoundland), in the eastern part of Newfoundland, Canada

Other
Ten Mile Lake Provincial Park, in British Columbia
Ten Mile Lake Township, Lac qui Parle County, Minnesota